is a Japanese idol singer, and a former  member of the Japanese idol girl group AKB48. She was a member of AKB48's Team K.

Career 

Tano passed the AKB48 12th generation audition for the trainee section in February 2011. On March 24, 2012, at AKB48's concert at Saitama Super Arena, it was announced that she was promoted to full AKB48 members in the new Team 4. She was transferred to Team A after the AKB48 Tokyo Dome Shuffle on August 24, 2012. She placed 7th in rock-paper-scissors tournament on September 18, 2013, and joined the Senbatsu member for the first time in the 34th single released on December 11, 2013.

On February 24, 2014, during the AKB48 Group Daisokaku Matsuri, it was announced that she was transferred to team K. On October 21, 2014, she and Ayaka Umeda were both chosen as Dorothy, the main character of the musical Wiz: The Wizard of Oz directed by
Amon Miyamoto. In the elections for the 41st single of AKB48, she placed 47th overall with 18,048 votes and became Next Girls.

She played the supporting role in the musical DNA-SHARAKU which performed in Tokyo, Osaka, and Fukuoka from January to February, 2016. On September 15, 2016, it was revealed that Tano placed 99th overall with 8,636 votes in the 45th single election.

On March 15, 2018, she announced that she will graduate from AKB48, she graduated on May 15, 2018 at her final performance at the AKB48 theater, and her handshake event was held on August 12.

After her graduation from AKB48, she mostly performed in stage musicals, namely THE CIRCUS, a live-action version of the anime W'z and a live-action version of the video game Nobunaga's Ambition. In 2020, she appeared as a character in the Hinatazaka46 drama Dasada. In May 2020, she was supposed to be a cast member of the stage play SAMBA NIGHT 2020, but due to the COVID-19 pandemic, the stage was cancelled. Later that month, it was announced she would be starring alongside Ayana Shinozaki in the YouTube web drama Reiwa 2-nen Online Yomikai Yatte Mita.

Discography

Singles with AKB48

Other Singles

Albums with AKB48
 1830m
 "Chokkaku Sunshine" (Team 4)
 "Aozora yo Sabishikunai Ka?" (AKB48 + SKE48 + NMB48 + HKT48)
 Tsugi no Ashiato
 "Kakushin ga Moterumono" (Team A)
 Koko ga Rhodes da, Koko de Tobe!
 "Conveyor" (Team K)
 "Downtown Hotel 100 Goushitsu"
 0 to 1 no Aida
 "Ai no Shisha" (Team K)
 "Hajimari no Yuki"
 Thumbnail
 "Dakara Kimi ga Sukina no ka"

Bokutachi wa, Ano Hi no Yoake o Shiteiru

 "Mystery Line"

Stage units
 Team A 6th Stage "Mokugekisha"
 "Mini Skirt no Yōsei"
 "Itoshisa no Accel"

 Team K 6th Stage "Reset"
 "Lemon no Toshigoro"
 "Kokoro no Hashi no Sofa"

 Team B 5th Stage "Theater no Megami"
 "Romance Kakurenbo"
 "Hatsukoi Yo Konnichiwa"
 "Arashi no Yoru ni wa"

 Team 4 1st Stage "Boku no Taiyō"
 "Itoshisa no Defense"
 "Boku to Juliet to Jet Coaster"
 "Idol Nante Yobanaide"

 Yokoyama Team A Waiting
 "Skirt, Hirari"
 "Garasu no I Love You"
 "Ame no Pianist"
 "Dakishimeraretara"
 "Zannen Shōjo"

 Team K 7th Stage "Reset"
 "Seifuku Resistance"
 "Kokoro no Hashi no Sofa"
 "Gyakuten Ōji Sama"
 "Kiseki wa Maniawanai"

 Shunpūtei Koasa "Eve wa Adam no Rokkotsu"
 "Ame no Pianist"
 "Kuroi Tenshi"

 Team K 4th Stage "Saishū Bell ga Naru"
 "Gomenne Jewel"
Special Stage "Kamikyouku Shibari"
 "Escape"

Appearances

TV dramas
 Majisuka Gakuen 3 (TV Tokyo, 2012)
 So long! Episode 1 (NTV, 2013)
 Majisuka Gakuen 5 (NTV and Hulu, 2015), as Amon
 AKB Horror Night: Adrenaline's Night Ep.10 - Drive (TV Asahi, 2015), as Yukari
 AKB Love Night: Love Factory Ep.28 - Jinx of Ferris Wheel (TV Asahi, 2016), as Tomomi
Dasada (Nippon TV, 2020), as Matsuko Neruma

Web dramas
 Crow's Blood (Hulu, 2016), as an infected girl
Chikai youde Toukutte (Twitter, 2019), as Yuna Yokoi
Reiwa 2-nen Online Yomikai Yatte Mita (YouTube, 2020)

Reading dramas 

 Hotel Plaza Suite (2019)

Films
Linking Love (2017), as Miyu Mashio 
Ginji the Speculator (2022)

Documentary shows
 AKB48 Ura Story: Tano Yūka 17-sai, Namida no Riyū (TBS, 2014)
 AKB48 Shuen! Miyamoto Amon Musical "Wiz" Kanzen Micchaku SP (NTV, 2015)

Commercials
 Joysound (2012-)

Stages
 Traumerei ni Sayonara (2014), as Yurika Ogawa (Leading Role)
 Super Soulful Musical "Wiz: The Wizard of Oz" (2015), as Dorothy (Leading Role)
 Majisuka Gakuen: Kyōto Keppū Shūgaku Ryokō (2015)
 DNA-SHARAKU (New National Theatre Tokyo, 2016), as Lemon Shirosaki (Supporting Role) 
 Majisuka Gakuen: Lost In The SuperMarket (Akasaka ACT Theater, 2016), as Uvall
 You're a Good Man, Charlie Brown (Theatre Creation, 2017), as Sally (Supporting Role)
The Circus: Episode 1 - The Core (Tokyo, Aichi, Osaka, Fukouka, 2017), as Nadia (Supporting Role)
TENTH: 10 Year Anniversary of Toho Stage (Tokyo, 2018), as Sally (Supporting Role)
The Circus: Episode 2 - Separation (Tokyo, Aichi, Osaka, Fukuoka, 2018), as Nadia (Supporting Role)
Heaven's Record ~Aozora Hen~ (Tokyo, Kobe, 2018) (Supporting Role)
Dance Cantabile 2018 (Tokyo, 2018), as herself (Supporting Role)
Singular (Tokyo, 2019), as Heart (Leading Role)
W'z (Tokyo, 2019), as Hana Mihara (Supporting Role)
Hoeru (Tokyo, 2019) (Supporting Role)
Shotou Kyouiku Royal (Osaka, 2019) (Supporting Role)
The Circus: The Final Episode (Tokyo, Aichi, Osaka, Fukuoka, 2019), as Nadia (Supporting Role)
Nobunaga's Ambition (Tokyo, 2019)
LIFE RESET? (Tokyo, 2020)
Samba Night 2020 (Tokyo, 2020)
Everybody's Talking About Jamie (Tokyo, Horipro, 2021), as Vicki (Supporting Role)
Peter Pan (Tokyo, Horipro, 2022), as Tiger Lily (Supporting Role)

Music videos 

 Ohashi Trio S・M・I・L・E・S (2019)

Awards
 The 4th Karaage Grand Prix: Best Karaagenist in Idol Category

References

External links 
 Official profile on AKB48 website 
  
 

1997 births
Living people
AKB48 members
Japanese idols
Singers from Tokyo
21st-century Japanese women singers
21st-century Japanese singers